L'Épiphanie is a town in Lanaudière, Quebec, Canada, located on the bank of the L'Achigan river. It has nearly 9,000 inhabitants and was 150 years old in 2004.

On May 23, 2018, the town was greatly enlarged when the Parish Municipality of L'Épiphanie was added to it.

Name 
Since 1732, the place was known as L'Achigan, thus taking the name of the river flowing through its territory. It was not until 1853 that the name L'Épiphanie appeared. This coincided with the moment of the canonical establishment of the parish, which had just separated from L'Assomption. Historians generally agree to see in this name the transposition of a Sulpician custom. They were owners of the Saint-Sulpice seigneury within which a large part of the territory of L'Épiphanie was included. On January 6 of each year, the day of the Epiphany, the Sulpicians came to celebrate a mass and took advantage of it to collect the seigniorial rents which were due to them. Ignace Bourget, Bishop of Montreal from 1840 to 1876, would have liked to recall this custom by retaining the name L'Épiphanie.

Demographics 

Mother tongue:
 English as first language: 0%
 French as first language: 96.5%
 English and French as first language: 1%
 Other as first language: 2.5%

Economy

Agriculture

L'Épiphanie was once a thriving industrial city. The first important industry was that of the Lynch family with the manufacture of furniture. But it was the cigar industry with the Bourdon family that long characterized the economy of L'Épiphanie. This industry led to the development of another company: the "Cigar Box" factory. This became thirty years later "Canada Manufacturing", specializing in the manufacture of boxes of all kinds. "Source Colombia", meanwhile, began its activities between 1880 and 1912. For many years, it provided mineral water equal in quality to imported water. But most of these companies, for various reasons, ceased their activities in the sixties. Today, agriculture is the main economic sector of the city.

Cemeteries
Cemeteries in or near L'Épiphanie include the L'Épiphanie Cemetery, the Grand Cemetery of L'Assomption, and the Saint-Gérard-Majella Cemetery.

Climate
Based on the Vercheres station

Sports
L'Épiphanie is home to the Chasse Gallerie boating circuit and the Chez Ti-Jean cross country skiing center.

Gallery

See also
 List of cities in Quebec

References

Cities and towns in Quebec
Incorporated places in Lanaudière
Greater Montreal